Pat O'Hara Wood and Suzanne Lenglen defeated the defending champions Randolph Lycett and Elizabeth Ryan in the final, 6–4, 6–3 to win the mixed doubles tennis title at the 1922 Wimbledon Championships.

Draw

Finals

Top half

Section 1

The nationality of RA Green is unknown.

Section 2

Bottom half

Section 3

The nationality of Mrs T Bostock is unknown.

Section 4

References

External links

X=Mixed Doubles
Wimbledon Championship by year – Mixed doubles